Ed Kucy (born October 19, 1971) is a former Canadian football offensive lineman who played three seasons in the Canadian Football League (CFL) with the Winnipeg Blue Bombers and Edmonton Eskimos. Kucy was drafted by the Winnipeg Blue Bombers in the fourth round of the 1994 CFL Draft. He played college football at the University of Arizona.

External links
Just Sports Stats
Fanbase profile

Living people
1971 births
Players of Canadian football from Alberta
American football offensive linemen
Canadian football offensive linemen
Arizona Wildcats football players
Winnipeg Blue Bombers players
Edmonton Elks players
Canadian football people from Edmonton